The James Bond film series is a British series of spy films based on the fictional character of MI6 agent James Bond, "007", who originally appeared in a series of books by Ian Fleming. There have been twenty-five films in total released between 1962 and 2021 and produced by Eon Productions, which now holds the adaptation rights to all of Fleming's Bond novels. Bond has been portrayed in these films by six actors: Sean Connery, George Lazenby, Roger Moore, Timothy Dalton, Pierce Brosnan, and Daniel Craig.

Several supporting characters that have appeared many times in the series, such as M, Q, and Miss Moneypenny, played by different actors across the twenty-seven films. As these are MI6 posts, not character names, some of the actor changes reflect an in-universe replacement. Such change was explicit for M in GoldenEye (1995), with Judi Dench's character referred to as a newcomer, and in Skyfall (2012), as Ralph Fiennes' character Gareth Mallory replaces Dench's character as M; it was explicit for Q in Die Another Day (2002), as John Cleese's character replaces Desmond Llewelyn's Q after being his apprentice in The World Is Not Enough (1999). There is only one clear case of a single M, Q, or Moneypenny character switching actor: when Q, Major Boothroyd, switches from Peter Burton in Dr. No (1962) to Desmond Llewelyn in From Russia with Love (1963).

Overview

By era

1962–1971: Sean Connery and George Lazenby

1973–1985: Roger Moore

1987–1989: Timothy Dalton

1995–2002: Pierce Brosnan

2006–2021: Daniel Craig

See also
 Outline of James Bond

Notes

References

External links
 Official website for the film series

James Bond in film
Recurring